The 6th constituency of Alpes-Maritimes is a French legislative constituency represented in the XIIIth legislature by Laurence Trastour-Isnart of the Republicans.  It contains the towns of Cagnes-sur-Mer, Saint-Laurent-du-Var, and their environs.

Historic Representation

Election results

2022

2017

2012

2007

2002

 
 
 
 
 
 
|-
| colspan="8" bgcolor="#E9E9E9"|
|-

1997

 
 
 
 
 
|-
| colspan="8" bgcolor="#E9E9E9"|
|-

References

Sources
Results at the Ministry of the Interior (French)

6